Marion Boyd ( late 15th century) of Bonshaw, also known as Margot or Margaret, was a mistress of King James IV of Scotland, and his first important mistress.

They had two children who reached adulthood: Alexander, born about 1490, and Catherine, who married James Douglas, 3rd Earl of Morton.

Marion also had an illegitimate son with James Hamilton, 1st Earl of Arran. Their son James Hamilton of Finnart was born illegitimate about 1495 but was later legitimated in 1512.

She was related to Thomas Boyd, Earl of Arran, and a niece of the second wife of Archibald Douglas, 5th Earl of Angus.  Her relationship with the king was linked with the rise and fall of Angus's influence at the court.

External links
history of Clan Boyd

References

Mistresses of James IV of Scotland
15th-century Scottish women
Year of birth unknown
Year of death unknown